35 Combat Engineer Regiment (35CER) (French: 35e Régiment du génie de combat) is a reserve unit of the Canadian Military Engineers in Quebec City, Quebec, Canada. It is part of the 35 Canadian Brigade Group, 2nd Canadian Division.

References

Order of precedence

See also

 Military history of Canada
 History of the Canadian Army
 Canadian Forces
 List of armouries in Canada

Engineer regiments of Canada